Helen Kassia (Kass) Fleisher (October 21, 1959 – January 6, 2023) was an American writer best known for her fiction and creative nonfiction.

Biography
Fleisher earned degrees in English from Dickinson College (B.A., 1981), the University of North Dakota (M.A., 1989), and Binghamton University (Ph.D., 1993). Fleisher was the author of five books and numerous essays and reviews, and the editor, with Caitlin M. Alvarez, of a literary anthology. With her frequent writing partner, Joe Amato, Fleisher wrote several screenplays (none of which have been produced to date). From 2003 to 2023, Fleisher was a member of the creative writing faculty at Illinois State University in Normal, Illinois. She founded Steerage Press in 2011.

Books 

As author
The Bear River Massacre and the Making of History (SUNY Press, 2004)
Accidental Species: A Reproduction (Chax Press, 2005)
The Adventurous (Factory School, 2006)
Talking out of School: Memoir of an Educated Woman (Dalkey Archive Press, 2008)
Dead Woman Hollow (SUNY Press, 2012)

As editor
Litscapes: Collected US Writings 2015 (Steerage Press), 2015)

External links
Official site of Kass Fleisher
Obituary for Kass Fleisher

References

1959 births
2022 deaths
21st-century American memoirists
21st-century American novelists
Dickinson College alumni
Illinois State University faculty
American women novelists
American women memoirists
American women essayists
21st-century American women writers
21st-century American essayists
Novelists from Illinois
American women academics
People from Wilmington, Delaware